Goharshad Ghazvini, also known as Goharshad Hassani Ghazvini, was a prominent Persian calligrapher of Nastaʿlīq script in the 17th century. She was Mir Emad's daughter. She learned calligraphy when she was a teenager and learned Nastaʿlīq script from her father.

After her father's death, she went in 1623 to her birthplace, Qazvin, and worked as a calligraphy teacher and stayed there until her death in 1628.

References 

People from Qazvin
Iranian calligraphers
16th-century births
Women calligraphers
17th-century calligraphers
1628 deaths